Samson  is a 1961 Italian and French international co-production peplum film shot in Yugoslavia. It was written and directed by Gianfranco Parolini in his first film with Brad Harris who plays the title role. 

It is the film which introduced the character of Samson, cleared of his Biblical traits, into the sword-and-sandal cinema. Following the success of Samson, the character was later featured in a series of four films released between 1963 and 1965.

Plot  
The treacherous court counselor Warkalla takes possession of the throne of Sulan and of the goods of Queen Mila, replacing her with the beautiful  but insignificant Romilda. Samson joins Mila and the rebels to regain the kingdom of Sulan and to hunt Romilda and Warkalla.

Cast  
 Brad Harris: Samson 
 Alan Steel: Macigno aka Hercules  
 Serge Gainsbourg: Warkalla 
 Mara Berni: Romilda 
 Luisella Boni: Janine (credited as Brigitte Corey) 
 Carlo Tamberlani: Botan 
 Irena Prosen: Mila 
 Franco Gasparri:  Mila's son
 Vladimir Leib as Terrabentus

Reception
Serge Gainsbourg's performance as the creepy villain Warkalla has been highlighted as the film's strongpoint.

Biography

References

External links

  
1961 films
1961 adventure films
Peplum films
Films directed by Gianfranco Parolini
Sword and sandal films
1960s Italian-language films
1960s Italian films